Victor Longomba Besange Lokuli, commonly known as Vicky Longomba, (13 December 1932 – 12 March 1988 in Kinshasa) was a singer and a founding member of Tout puissant OK Jazz, a Congolese rumba group.

He later formed his own group, Lovy du Zaire.

He was the father of Lovy Longomba (member of Super Mazembe) and Awilo Longomba, both popular musicians.

References

20th-century Democratic Republic of the Congo male singers
TPOK Jazz members
1932 births
1988 deaths